Karsten Lippmann (born 21 June 1958 in Hanover, West Germany) is a retired German swimmer who won a bronze medal in the  freestyle relay at the 1978 World Aquatics Championships.

Lippmann works as a swimming coach in Hannover. His father was an engineer and his mother was a secretary. His brother Ulrich is also a former competitive swimmer.

References

1958 births
Living people
German male swimmers
German male freestyle swimmers
World Aquatics Championships medalists in swimming
Sportspeople from Hanover
20th-century German people
21st-century German people